The Association of Independent Creative Editors, or AICE, was an international organization of 120 editorial companies representing over 600 editors throughout the United States and Toronto. AICE had chapters in Chicago, Texas, Detroit, Los Angeles, Minneapolis, New York, San Francisco, and Toronto. In 2018, AICE merged with the Association of Independent Commercial Producers. At the time of its merger with the AICP, editors who belonged to AICE were responsible, according to its website, for editing over 85% of all network television commercials shown in the U.S. and Canada.

See also
Re-cut trailers

References

Television organizations in the United States

External links
 AICE Official Website